Heaven Knows (1992) is a compilation of Blancmange singles, album and non-album tracks.

This compilation marks the first appearance of tracks 2, 3, 7, 11 and 15 on Compact Disc.

Track listing

CD: ELITE024 CDP

 All songs written by Neil Arthur & Stephen Luscombe, except for "The Day Before You Came", written by Benny Andersson & Björn Ulvaeus.

1992 compilation albums
Blancmange (band) compilation albums

ja:Heaven Knows